Berlinghieri is an Italian surname. Notable people with the surname include:

Barone Berlinghieri, Italian painter, Berlinghiero's son
Berlinghiero also known as Berlinghiero Berlinghieri, Italian painter of the early thirteenth century
Bonaventura Berlinghieri, Italian painter, Berlinghiero's son
Camillo Berlinghieri (died 1635), Baroque painter
Francesco Berlinghieri (1440–1501), Italian humanist
Marco Berlinghieri, Italian painter, Berlinghiero's son

Italian-language surnames